Discover Russian (DR) was the first Russian television program on the Pacific coast of North America.  It was produced by Pamirus Production under the direction of producer and presenter Nathalie Potocka. In 38 episodes, this cultural variety show featured interviews with prominent people from various disciplines, including:
artists
dancers
musicians
hockey players; and
figure skaters

Some of the guests on Discover Russian included:
maestro Mstislav Rostropovich
ballerina Evelyn Hart
pianist Gregory Sokolov
violinist Vadim Gluzman
legendary figure skater Alexei Yagudin
conductor Bramwell Tovey
Alexander Pushkin 
Peter Tchaikowsky 
Sergey Rachmaninoff ; and
Nicolas Rimsky-Korsakov

The program also featured a series dedicated to great Russian writers and intelligentsia, Anton Chekhov, Fyodor Dostoevsky and Mikhail Bulgakov. The program also hosted a number of interviews with local and international political and religious leaders.

External links 
Discover Russian
Pamirus Production

Year of television series debut missing
Year of television series ending missing
American variety television series